Vikings: The Strategy of Ultimate Conquest is a 1996 video game from GT Interactive. The game was narrated by actor Michael Dorn of "Star Trek: The Next Generation.

Reception

Computer Gaming World gave the game score of 1 out of 5 stating" Undoubtedly, this game would have looked good 10 years ago. But, today, this type of boring gameplay just looks old, canned and cliché"

References

1996 video games
Video games set in the Viking Age